Showmax is an online subscription video on demand (SVOD) service which launched in South Africa on 19 August 2015. Its majority owner is MultiChoice, which itself is a spin-off of Naspers, owner of 30.86% stake in Tencent which owns a similar service, Tencent Video and iflix.

Showmax uses a localisation strategy to take on established video on demand competitors with a focus on local content and partnerships with mobile telcos. In South Africa Showmax has managed to out compete eight domestic competitors. It continues to compete with international video steaming services Netflix, Disney+ and Amazon Prime Video.

Showmax's engineering team is based in the Czech Republic. Showmax publishes engineering and research articles on a technical blog.

History
In December 2015, Showmax expanded its reach to audiences in Europe, Australia, New Zealand, and North America, with lineups tailored for African expats.

In May 2016, Showmax expanded to 36 countries in Africa, taking the total number of countries in which Showmax is available to 65. In July of the same year, Showmax passed the 10 million views milestone.

In August 2016, the Showmax logo was changed from framed black and white logotype using camel case to an all lower-case logotype with added dark magenta and teal stripes. In October of the same year, Showmax launched Showmax Select and Showmax Premium in Kenya.

In January 2017, Showmax partnered with SEACOM to put caching servers in Nairobi, Kenya. A month later, Showmax launched in Poland.

In December 2017, Saturday Night Live Polska launched as their original series.

On 31 January 2019, Showmax was closed in Poland due to slow growth.

On 7 July 2020, Showmax Pro was launched in Kenya and Nigeria. The new service bundles the existing Showmax entertainment service with music channels, news, and live sport streaming from SuperSport. The offering includes all the games from the UK's Premier League, Italy's Serie A and La Liga, and South Africa's Premier Soccer League.

On March 2023, NBCUniversal announced to partnered with MultiChoice to co-operate Showmax in Africa, with NBCU own 30% of the joint venture which previously owned by Canal+. The joint venture will having Peacock technology and including contents from both Peacock and Sky during the re-launch.

Features

Downloads
Showmax's download feature allows users to download up to 25 shows or movies at a time and watch them offline on Android and iOS tablets and smartphones. There are four different quality settings to reduce the amount of data required to download.

Bandwidth capping
In August 2016, Showmax launched a bandwidth-capping tool that allows users to choose different quality levels. The bandwidth caps include a low cap of 300 MB per hour, a medium cap of 700 MB per hour, or to leave usage uncapped. In April 2022, Showmax announced that a new bandwidth cap would be introduced, called Max Data Saving, which allows subscribers to use only 50 MB per hour.

Multiple profiles
In August 2016, Showmax added a multiple profile feature including the ability to set up child-friendly profiles with four age settings.

Mobile plan 
In October 2019, Showmax introduced a mobile plan at 50% of the cost of the standard subscription price. According to Showmax, "Smartphones and tablets are, for many in Africa, the primary, if not only, window to the internet, and up until now none of the most popular SVoD services has designed a product specifically for mobile usage."

Showmax Pro
In July 2020, Showmax launched live sport streaming service Showmax Pro and began roll out across 40 countries in Africa. In June 2019, Showmax began testing sport live-streaming, and by 2022, the Showmax Pro service was available across 50 African countries in sub-Saharan Africa. Showmax Pro is available on up to five different devices, with two concurrent streams. The Showmax Pro Mobile service allows streaming on one device, with one stream. In October 2022, Showmax announced that for the first time, Showmax Pro subscribers could stream in 4K, with all 64 games of the FIFA World Cup Qatar 2022 available to stream in ultra-high-definition to subscribers across the continent.

Device support
This is a list of supported devices:
 Personal Computers (using web browsers)
 Apple iPhones and iPads running iOS 14.0 or higher
 Apple TV (4th Generation and later)
 Android phones and tablets running Android 4.1 or higher
 Android media and TV devices running Android 4.1 or higher
 Samsung Smart TVs (2012 and later)
 Samsung Tizen Smart TVs (2015 and later)
 LG NetCast Smart TVs (2012 to 2014)
 LG WebOS Smart TVs (2014 and later)
 Hisense Vidaalite 2.0, Vidaa U2 Smart TVs (2016 and later, Africa only)
 DStv Explora (South Africa, Kenya, Nigeria only)
 Apple AirPlay
 Google Cast (casting from the Showmax app for Android or iOS)
 Xbox One and Xbox Series X/S
 PlayStation 4 and PlayStation 5 (South Africa only)

Availability
Showmax is available in the following countries:

Africa 
Benin, Botswana, Burkina Faso, Burundi, Cabo Verde, Cameroon, Central African Republic, Chad, Comoros, Congo, Democratic Republic of the Congo, Djibouti, Equatorial Guinea, Eritrea, Eswatini, Ethiopia, Gabon, Gambia, Ghana, Guinea, Guinea-Bissau, Ivory Coast, Kenya, Lesotho, Liberia, Madagascar, Malawi, Mali, Mauritius, Namibia, Niger, Nigeria, Reunion, Rwanda, Saint Helena, Ascension and Tristan da Cunha, São Tomé and Príncipe, Senegal, Seychelles, South Africa, Tanzania, Togo, Uganda, Zambia, and Zimbabwe

Outside Africa 
Andorra, Australia, Austria, Belgium, Denmark, Finland, France, Germany, Greece, Iceland, Indonesia, Ireland, Italy, Liechtenstein, Luxembourg, Malta, Monaco, Netherlands, New Zealand, Norway, Portugal, San Marino, Spain, Sweden, Switzerland, and United Kingdom

No longer available 
Poland and North America

Content

In Africa the Showmax catalogue consists of Hollywood, British, Kenyan and South African content. Outside of Africa the Showmax catalogue consists of Showmax Originals, kykNET International, M-Net, Mzansi Magic, and Via content targeted primarily at an expat audience.

Showmax has content in English, Afrikaans, isiZulu, Kiswahili, Sepedi, SeTswana, Sesotho and isiXhosa.

Showmax Originals

Tali's Wedding Diary
On 13 June 2017, Showmax announced that filming of its first original series Tali's Wedding Diary, a mockumentary featuring Julia Anastasopoulos, had begun.
On 16 November 2017, Showmax released a trailer for Tali's Wedding Diary. It was announced that it would be available on Showmax on 14 December 2017.

Tali's Wedding Diary was the most-awarded comedy at the South African Film and Television Awards in 2019, making Showmax the first streaming service to win at the awards.

In November 2020, shooting for the follow-up series, Tali's Baby Diary, was announced, and all 10 episodes landed on Showmax in March 2021, with critics calling it "the best South African TV show of 2021 so far". The main cast returned for the follow-up, which followed Tali and her husband Darren as they prepared for the birth of their first child. Julia Anastasopoulos returned as Tali, with Anton Taylor reprising his role as Darren, Glen Biderman-Pam as Darren's business partner Rael, and Lara Toselli as Tali's frenemy, Gabi. New faces included Siv Ngesi as Rael and Darren's corporate nemesis and Kate Pinchuk as their new receptionist.

In August 2022, Showmax announced that filming on the third instalment of the show, Tali's Joburg Diary, had started. New weekly episodes of Tali's Joburg Diary landed on Showmax in November 2022. All episodes are now streaming.

The Girl From St Agnes

Showmax's first original drama series The Girl From St Agnes was released on 31 January 2019. In the eight-part murder mystery, the mysterious death of a schoolgirl at an elite boarding school sets off a desperate hunt for the truth. The series was filmed on location in the KwaZulu-Natal Midlands.

Trippin with Skhumba 
In February 2019, Showmax announced its first original travel show, Trippin with Skhumba, hosted by South African comedian Skhumba Hlope. The theme music used for the series is the hit record "Spirit" by Kwesta. The series launched on 28 February. Guests on the first season include South African comedians such as Celeste Ntuli, Siya Seya, Salesman, Mashabela Galane, Tumi Morake and Schalk Bezuidenhout.

Somizi & Mohale: The Union 
In February 2020, Showmax premiered Somizi & Mohale: The Union. The four-part wedding special featuring Somizi Mhlongo and Mohale Motaung broke viewing records on Showmax.

Rage 
In March 2020, Showmax launched its first original horror movie. In Rage, a group of school-leavers goes to a tiny coastal town to celebrate the end of their school careers.

Life With Kelly Khumalo 
In August 2020, Showmax premiered reality show Life With Kelly Khumalo, starring award-winning South African singer Kelly Khumalo.

Season 2 of Life With Kelly Khumalo aired on Showmax from May to August 2021.

Season 3 of Life With Kelly Khumalo launched on 5 July 2022, with new episodes every Tuesday until 27 September 2022. The third season follows the star at the pinnacle of her career and the height of her fame.

The Real Housewives of Durban 
On the 29th of January 2021, Showmax premiered the Showmax-exclusive Durban franchise of The Real Housewives. The show is based on an ensemble cast of six women from Durban. The Season 1 cast was made up of Sorisha Naidoo, Annie Mthembu, Kgomotso Ndungane, Ayanda Ncwane, Nonku Williams, and Nonkanyiso Conco (also known as LaConco and MaConco). 

In September 2021, Showmax announced that the second season of The Real Housewives of Durban, as well as the first season of The Real Housewives of Lagos, would premiere in early 2022.

In January 2022, the cast of The Real Housewives of Durban Season 2 was announced: Sorisha Naidoo, Annie Mthembu, Nonku Williams and LaConco would be returning for the second season, joined by Jojo Robinson, Londie London and Thobile MaKhumalo Mseleku. The Real Housewives of Durban Season 2 started on 28 January 2022, with new weekly episodes landing on Showmax every Friday until 15 April 2022.

On 6 May 2022, Showmax released the first of the two-part season reunion, with the second part of the reunion landing on 13 May 2022.

In January 2023, Showmax announced the return of The Real Housewives of Durban, and Season 3 landed on 1 February 2023, with new episodes available to stream every Wednesday thereafter.  Returning to the new season are cast members Annie Mthembu, Jojo Robinson, Nonku Williams and Sorisha Naidoo, with Maria Valaskatzis, Mbali Ngiba and Slindile Wendy Ndlovu joined for the first time.

Crime and Justice 

This police procedural and legal drama, consisting of 8 episodes, was both Kenya’s first Showmax Original and Showmax’s first co-production with Canal+. The episodes are based on Kenyan true crime stories, and stars Sarah Hassan and Alfred Munyua as two detectives with the Nairobi Metropol Police. The first season premiered on Showmax in February 2020, and the series has since been nominated for three Kalasha Awards, including Best TV Drama, Best Lead Actress and Best Lead Actor. In November 2021, Showmax announced that filming had begun on a second season of Crime and Justice.

New episodes of Season 2 of Crime and Justice landed on Showmax from 21 February 2022.

The Nigerian spin-off, Crime and Justice Lagos, launched on Showmax in December 2022. All episodes are now streaming.

DAM 

Showmax announced in November 2020 that filming had wrapped on the psychological thriller DAM, which landed on Showmax in February 2021, drawing comparisons to HBO's The Outsider.

DAM is an eight-episode Showmax Original made in partnership with the Eastern Cape Development Corporation, the Amathole District Municipality and Picture Tree, shot on location in the towns of Bedford and Adelaide in the Eastern Cape.

Lea Vivier stars as Yola Fischer, who returns to the small town where she grew up after the death of her father. Pallance Dladla plays the biker Themba, who arrives in town after fleeing secrets of his own, and Faniswa Yisa plays his aunt Lindiwe. Other cast members include Natasha Loring as Yola's sister, Sienna, and Antoinette Louw as their aunt Dora.

DAM was the most nominated drama at the South African Film and Television Awards (SAFTAs) in September 2022, with 11 nominations. Natasha Loring won her first SAFTA for her role as Sienna, and Sue Steele won for Best Art Directing.

In September 2022, Showmax announced that filming on Season 2 had begun in the Eastern Cape. Season 2 landed on 16 February 2023, with new episodes dropping every Thursday.

Skemerdans 
In March 2021, Showmax released the first trailer for the Cape Flats neo-noir series Skemerdans, created and directed by Amy Jephta with Ephrahim Gordon co-directing.

The 13-episode mystery series landed on Showmax in April 2021, with Kevin Smith, llse Klink, Vinette Ebrahim, Brendon Daniels and Trudy van Rooy starring as the members of the Fortune family, who find themselves at the centre of an investigation after a murder is committed at the Oasis Jazz Club, which their family have owned for decades.

Devilsdorp

Temptation Island South Africa 
Showmax announced in February 2021 that it had licensed its first international reality format and would be bringing Temptation Island to South African shores. Temptation Island South Africa premiered on 26 August 2021, with the trailer dropping on 26 July 2021, introducing the four couples who would be putting their relationships to the test by living in a men's and women's villa with hot singles looking for love.

Temptation Island South Africa was produced by Afrokaans Film & Television and hosted by Phat Joe. Distributed by Banijay Rights, the global distribution arm of Banijay, Temptation Island is a Teen Choice-nominated pop culture phenomenon, which has been adapted 25 times and counting.

The explosive two-part reunion of Temptation Island South Africa brought the couples and singles back to screens on 25 November 2021, marking the end of the 14-episode season.

Ghana Jollof 
In August 2021, the cast for the first Showmax Original comedy series in West Africa, Ghana Jollof, was revealed. Directed by Diji Aderogba (About A Boy) and produced by Nigerian comedian Basketmouth, the 13-episode series includes an ensemble Nigerian and Ghanaian cast.

The Wife 
In August 2021, Showmax announced a new slate of Original series that included an adaptation of the best-selling novel Hlomu The Wife, self-published by South Africa author Dudu Busani-Dube. Billed as Showmax's first Original telenovela, The Wife is produced by Stained Glass, the same production company behind eHostela and Uzalo, the latter being the most-watched soap opera in South Africa.

The Wife is divided into three seasons. Each season is based on one of Dudu Busani-Dube's books in the series: Hlomu The Wife, Zandile The Resolute, and Naledi His Love. The first three episodes premiered on Showmax on 11 November 2021, and broke the streaming platform's record for the most first-day views, which was previously held by controversial reality series Uthando Lodumo. The Wife also broke Showmax's record for the most hours watched within four days of launch, which was previously held by true crime documentary Devilsdorp.

Season 1 of The Wife came to an end on 3 February 2022 and Season 2 started on 17 February 2022, starring Khanyi Mbau as Zandile. Season 2 ended on 5 May 2022, with Season 3 slated to land on the platform late in 2022.

On 5 August 2022, Showmax launched The Wife: Behind the Veil, an eight-episode Original that tells the behind-the-scenes stories of The Wife Seasons 1-2.

In September 2022, Showmax announced that Season 3 of The Wife had started being filmed, and that it would land on the platform in November 2023. On 10 November 2022, the first three episodes of Season 3 landed, introducing Wiseman Mncube as the new star portraying Mqhele Zulu. Gaisang K Noge and Kwenzo Ngcobo return as Naledi and Qhawe respectively, the star-crossed lovers at the centre of the season. Three new episodes land every Thursday, with a broadcast break on 16 February 2023 and 23 February 2023, and the finale slated for 6 April 2023.

Baba Twins 
In November 2021, Showmax announced its first Kenyan Showmax Original film, Baba Twins, a comedy-drama produced by Lucy Mwangi, known for her work on award-winning series Njoro wa Uba. Baba Twins follows young airline hostess Wamz, played by Violetta Ngina, and radio presenter Tony, played by Morris Mwangi, who unexpectedly become parents to twins. The movie was released on Showmax on 15 December 2021.

Troukoors (Wedding Fever) 
In November 2021, Showmax released the trailer for its first Original romcom, Troukoors (Wedding Fever), which landed on Showmax on 13 December 2021, and already renewed for a second season. The 14-episode first season followed wedding planner Jessica, played by Ilse-Lee van Niekerk, who is surrounded by love but struggling to find it for herself. Troukoors is created by SAFTA winner Louis Pretorius and SAFTA nominee Albert Snyman, with regular collaborator Nina Swart directing.

Blyde Smit stars as Jessica's sister Luca, and Bianca Flanders plays her best friend, Abi. Other stars in Season 1 include Lea Vivier, Armand Aucamp, Evan Hengst, Kevin Smith and Christiaan Schoombie.

Season 2 of Troukoors was announced on 6 April 2022, and the full boxset of Season 2 landed on 5 May 2022.

Single Kiasi 
Adapted from the South African drama series Unmarried, Single Kiasi is a Kenyan Showmax Original about three women dealing with life, love, the daily hustle and their careers in Nairobi.

Gathoni Mutua plays Sintamei, Minne Kariuki plays Mariah, and Faith Kibathi stars as Rebecca.

Single Kiasi (originally titled Single-ish) landed on Showmax on 20 January 2022, and all episodes are now available to stream.

Season 2 of Single Kiasi launched on Showmax on 16 January 2023, with new episodes landing every Monday.

Sex in Afrikaans 
The six-part docuseries Sex in Afrikaans premiered on Showmax on 14 February 2022. Clinical psychologist Bradley R Daniels helps four Afrikaans couples and two singles to have candid conversations about their sex lives for the first time in public. All six episodes were made available as a boxset on the day of launch.

ENO 
The First Showmax Original from Ghana, ENO follows a family of three sisters who are pushed by their mother, Abena Baafi the matriarch, into the path of wealthy suitors. But the girls all have minds of their own, and their mother's dream quickly turns into their worst nightmare.

Gloria Osei-Sarfo plays Abena, Emelia Asieudu plays Tessa, the eldest daughter, Esi Hammond plays Safowaa, the bookish middle daughter, and Mariam Owusu Poku plays the lastborn, Kendall.

ENO premiered on 4 March 2022.

The Real Housewives of Lagos 

In September 2021, Showmax announced that The Real Housewives of Lagos would premiere in early 2022. On Friday, 8 April 2022, the first episode dropped on Showmax, featuring businesswoman Carolyna Hutchings, influencer Laura Ikeji-Kanu, lawyer and luxury hair brand owner Chioma Ikokwu, celebrity stylist Toyin Lawani-Adebayo, Nollywood actress Iyabo Ojo and PR expert Mariam Timmer.

All episodes of The Real Housewives of Lagos are available on Showmax, including the explosive two-part reunion.

Living The Dream With Somizi Season 5 
On 12 April 2022, Showmax announced that the fifth season of the reality show Living the Dream with Somizi would be landing first on Showmax on 4 May 2022, picking up after his split with Mohale. The first four seasons are also available on Showmax to stream. The fifth season featured appearances from some of South Africa's most celebrated celebrities as well as Somizi's family, including his daughter Bahumi. The finale landed on 6 July 2022.

Igiza 
On 5 May 2022, Showmax announced the upcoming Kenyan Original, Igiza. The thriller series, set against the backdrop of Nairobi's fashion industry, landed on Showmax on 23 May 2022, starring Serah Ndanu playing the role of twin sisters. New episodes drop every Monday.

Pulse 
The Showmax Original horror, Pulse, was announced on 23 May 2022, and all episodes dropped on Showmax on 23 June 2022. The series follows a group of video game developers who become trapped in a real-world version of their own creation when they’re cornered in their high-rise office building by a madman who just wants to play. Tarryn Wyngaard, Thapelo Mokoena, Sven Ruygrok and Carel Nel star, and Sallas de Jager directs.

Journey of the Beats 
The Nigerian Showmax Original that tells the story of Afrobeats - from its origins in the backstreets of Lagos to global festivals, stadiums and the Grammy Awards - premiered on Showmax on 23 June 2022, and is now available to binge-watch. Journey of the Beats featured some of Nigeria’s biggest artists, like 2Baba, P-Square, Onyeka Onwenu, Daddy Showkey, Flavour, and D’Banj.

Mohale: On the Record 
Mohale: On the Record, the Showmax Original tell-all special featuring Somizi's ex, Mohale Motaung, was announced on 13 June 2022. The interview landed on 4 August 2022.

County 49 
The Kenyan Showmax Original County 49 was announced on 4 August 2022, with the first episode landing on 25 August. The series follows the corruption and greed that threatens Kenya's fictional and flourishing 49th county.

BBNaija S7: The Buzz 
In August 2022, the seventh season of Big Brother Naija launched, streaming live on Showmax, along with the exclusive Showmax talk show The Buzz landing on Tuesdays and Saturdays, hosted by media personality Toke Makinwa.

Somizi & Mohale: End of the Road 
On 10 August 2022, Showmax announced the upcoming unauthorised documentary about Somizi and Mohale's high-profile wedding and separation, Somizi & Mohale: End of the Road. The documentary has been live on Showmax since 25 August 2022.

Uthando Lodumo 
With Season 1 of the reality series about the lives of Gqom superstars Mampintsha and Babes Wodumo available to binge-watch, Showmax released Season 2 of Uthando Lodumo on 1 September 2022, and all episodes are available to stream.

Steinheist 
At the end of August 2022, Showmax released the trailer for upcoming Showmax Original docuseries Steinheist, by the creators of the smash-hit Showmax Original Devilsdorp. Steinheist examines the biggest corporate scandal in South Africa's history. It was directed by Richard Finn Gregory and edited by Nikki Comninos. All three episodes have been available since 6 October 2022.

Blood Psalms 
In August 2022, Showmax released the first-look trailer for the African fantasy epic Blood Psalms. The first two epiosdes landed on 28 September, and new episodes land every Wednesday until the end of November 2022.

The cast includes Bokang Phelane as Princess Zazi, Mothusi Magano as her father, mad king Letsha, and Zolisa Xaluva as General Toka, the head of her father’s Akachi army.

Created by Layla Swart and Jahmil X.T. Qubeka from Yellowbone Entertainment, Blood Psalms is set in Ancient Africa, where the young Princess Zazi must save herself and her people from the end of the world. She faces warring tribes, angry gods - and her own father.

Diiche 

Diiche is the first Nigerian Showmax Original limited series. The psychological thriller about an A-list star implicated in the murder of her fiancé has been streaming since 29 September, and all episodes are now available to binge-watch.

Flawsome 

The first episode of the Showmax Original Nigerian drama series Flawsome landed on 10 November 2022. The series follows four close friends who navigate their careers, relationships and love lives as women in a man's world. The series stars Bisola Aiyeola, Ini Dima-Okojie, Sharon Ooja, and Enado Odigie.

Donkerbos 
South African crime thriller Donkerbos launched on Showmax in November 2022, and new episodes land every Tuesday until 17 January 2023. Set in Limpopo, the series is in English, Afrikaans and Venda, and follows troubled detective Fanie and her partner Tsedza, who are tasked with investigating the murder of multiple children in a small town.

Erica Wessels stars as Fanie and Sanda Shandu as Tsedza, with Stian Bam, Edwin van der Walt, Thoko Tshinga, Carel Nel, Leandie du Randt and more in the cast.

This Body Works For Me 
This reality show follows seven women who work in the South African adult entertainment industry, and launched in November on Showmax, with new episodes landing every week until 25 January 2023. This Body Works For Me cast members Bubbly, Gina, Nelly, Primadonna, Samke, Wandi, and Xoli give viewers a first-hand look into their lives, careers and hustles. The explosive reunion landed in March 2023.

My Perfect Funeral 
The Ghanaian Showmax Original reality show My Perfect Funeral follows the planning of extravagant funerals in Ghana. The 10-episode show seeks to answer the question - what does it take to pull off a Ghanaian funeral? New episodes landed every Thursday until 9 February 2023.

Pepeta 
The Kenyan drama series Pepeta follows four young footballers in Kenya - Junior, Dayo, Dimore and Ade - who are gearing up to make it professionally, but at what cost to their relationships, their families, and their happiness? Pepeta launched on Showmax in November 2022, with the last weekly episode landing on 12 January 2023.

Wura 

In December 2022, Showmax announced that their first Original telenovela in Nigeria would land on 23 January 2023. Wura tells the story of a ruthless mine boss and loving mother, played by up-and-coming Nollywood star Scarlet Gomez. Four new episodes land every week.

The Real Housewives of Abuja 
In January 2023, Showmax announced that the first instalment of The Real Housewives of Abuja hit the platform on 17 February 2023, with new episodes dropping every Friday thereafter. 

The new series follows the luxurious lives of six influential and successful women in Abuja. The women include Arafa, Comfort Booth, OJ Posharella, Princess Jecoco,  Samantha Homossany and Tutupie as they navigate their opulent lives, relationships, family and businesses within the powerful city of Abuja and beyond.

The Real Housewives of Nairobi 
Showmax announced that The Real Housewives of Nairobi was in production in September 2022, and the cast was unveiled in February 2023. The first episode lands on 23 February 2023, with new episodes every Thursday.

Sex and Pleasure 
In February 2023, Showmax announced that a new documentary series exploring what South Africans get up to behind closed doors, Sex and Pleasure, was coming soon. The first episode landed on 8 March 2023, with new episodes landing every Wednesday until 26 April 2023. The docuseries is hosted by writer Kim Windvogel and journalist Romantha Botha.

Stella Murders 
The team behind the Showmax Original Devilsdorp investigate the devastating and shocking deaths of two teenaged girls in their school hostel in the small town of Stella, North West, in 2018 in the true-crime documentary Stella Murders.  The documentary lands on Showmax on 17 March 2023.

Adulting 
New episodes of the Showmax Original drama series Adulting are landing on Showmax from 20 March 2023, with new episodes landing every Monday thereafter. The show follows four university friends who journey through life's ups and downs together, and stars Thembinkosi Mthembu as successful businessman Bonga, with Luthando BU Mthembu as toy-boy Vuyani, Thabiso Rammusi as cheating family man Mpho, and Nhanhla Kunene as hot-headed bad-boy Eric. Adulting is produced by Tshedza Pictures, the team behind the International Emmy-nominated telenovela The River and more.

The Billionaire's Wife 
The Ghanaian Showmax Original drama series The Billionaire's Wife landed on Showmax on 2 March 2023. The series consists of 10 episodes, which drop weekly on a Thursday, and follows 19-year-old Adepa, who marries a much older man in the hopes of changing her fortunes, only to discover that being a billionaire's wife may be the toughest thing she's ever done.

Jay Jay: The Chosen One 
In March 2023, Showmax announced an upcoming animated Showmax Original inspired by the life of Nigerian football legend Jay-Jay Okucha, called Jay Jay: The Chosen One. The series lands on 6 April 2023, and follows a football-crazy boy who is gifted with superpowers from his animal friends. Jay Jay: The Chosen One marks the start of Showmax's adventures in animated Originals.

References

External links
 
 Engineering Blog
 Showmax Stories (blog)

Subscription video on demand services
Internet properties established in 2015
2015 establishments in South Africa